Electroguitarpop is the second studio album by the electronic band Morbo. It was released in 2005 on Phoenix.

Track listing
All tracks composed by Juan Carlos Lozano and Yamil Rezc.

Personnel

Performing
Morbo
Juan Carlos Lozano – vocals, guitar, bass, synthesizer, programming
Yamil Rezc – percussion, Rhodes piano, guitar, synthesizer, programming

Technical
Juan Carlos Lozano – record production
Yamil Rezc – record production
Phil Vinall – audio mixing, record production assistance
Sean Magee – audio mastering
Raul Durand – audio mixing assistance

Design
Carlos Crespo – art, graphic design

2005 albums
Morbo (band) albums
Spanish-language albums